Carlos Wladimiro Atlagic Pinto (21 September 1915 – 22 August 1987), frequently referred as Ataglich or Atlagich, was a Chilean footballer who played as a midfielder.

Club career
As a child, Atlagic played for Los Canarios, the team of Colegio Don Bosco. In his early career, he played for José Miguel Carrera and Sportiva Italiana in his birthplace, Iquique. After doing the military service, he began his professional career playing for Santiago Badminton, where he was well-known by his strong shots. He used to win the competition to become the team captain, since it lied in shooting "with no bounce" and going as far as possible.

He also played for Colo-Colo, Santiago Wanderers and Audax Italiano, winning the 1948 Primera División de Chile. He frequently returned to Iquique to reinforce the city team, playing also versus Alianza Lima and Universitario from Peru.

International career
He played in four matches for the Chile national football team in the 1945 South American Championship. It was said that he was considered to be part of the Chile squad for the 1950 World Cup.

Personal life
He was nicknamed Obelisco (Obelisk) by Argentine spectators in Buenos Aires.

Honours
Audax Italiano
 Chilean Primera División: 1948

References

External links
 
 Carlos Atlagic at PartidosdeLaRoja 
 Carlos Atlagic at playmakerstats.com (English version of ceroacero.es)
 

1915 births
1987 deaths
People from Iquique
Chilean people of Croatian descent
Chilean footballers
Chile international footballers
Badminton F.C. footballers
Colo-Colo footballers
Audax Italiano footballers
Santiago Wanderers footballers
Chilean Primera División players
Association football midfielders